Blastopetrova is a genus of moths belonging to the subfamily Olethreutinae of the family Tortricidae. It contains only one species, Blastopetrova keteleericola, which is found in China (Guangxi, Yunnan).

The wingspan is 17–23 mm for males and 22.5–26 mm for females. There is an irregular cloudy pattern on the forewings, varying in colour from grey to reddish brown and black. The hindwings are grey.

The larvae feed on Keteleeria evelyniana.

See also
List of Tortricidae genera

References

External links
tortricidae.com

Eucosmini
Tortricidae genera
Monotypic moth genera